Gertraud Antonia Wagner-Schöppl (born Gertraud Antonia Schöppl on 21 September 1956 in Salzburg) is a former Austrian veterinarian and politician.

Biography
She was member of the Salzburg parliament from 1999 to 2004.

Her parents were a metal-industrial businessman Adolf Schöppl and wife Dr. iur. Edith Schöppl, of Viennese Jewish heritage.

She opened her private veterinary clinic and served as head of the Salzburg district veterinary department. The residents of the federal district of Salzburg elected her to the legislative counsel where she served to the benefit of people as well as animal protection. She received the Austrian Civil Decoration of the Golden Order of Salzburg. 

She is widowed to Waldemar Prinz zu Schaumburg-Lippe, who had adopted her son Mag. iur. Dr. iur. Mario-Max Prinz zu Schaumburg-Lippe, MAS, LL.M., né Mario-Helmut Wagner (born 23 Dec 1977 to her former husband, Dr. Helmut Wagner, MD).

Her husband Waldemar, her son and herself were very close to the late Helga-Lee of Schaumburg-Lippe.

Sources

External links
 Website schaumburg-lippe.org

1956 births
Living people
Politicians from Salzburg
Physicians from Salzburg
Austrian veterinarians
Austrian people of Jewish descent